The following is an episode list for the sitcom  Sumit Sambhal Lega. The series ran from August 31, 2015, to January 4, 2016, airing 108 episodes.

List of Episodes

References

External links

Sumit Sambhal Lega episodes on hotstar

Lists of Indian television series episodes
Lists of sitcom episodes
Sumit Sambhal Lega